Juan José Oré (born 12 June 1954) is a Peruvian football manager and a former striker.

Career
Oré played professional football in Peru, Greece and Chile. He won league titles in Peru with Universitario de Deportes and in Greece with Panathinaikos.

He was top scorer in Peru in 1978 with Universitario de Deportes and in Chile in 1988 with Deportes Iquique. he was also joint top scorer in Copa Libertadores 1979 with 6 goals.

Honours

Player
Club
Universitario de Deportes
 Peruvian First Division : 1974
Individual
Peruvian First Division: Top Goalscorer(19 goals) 1978
Copa Libertadores: Top Goalscorer 1979

References

External links

1954 births
Living people
Peruvian footballers
Peruvian expatriate footballers
Coronel Bolognesi footballers
Sporting Cristal footballers
Club Universitario de Deportes footballers
Panathinaikos F.C. players
OFI Crete F.C. players
Deportes Iquique footballers
Peruvian Primera División players
Chilean Primera División players
Expatriate footballers in Chile
Expatriate footballers in Greece
Peruvian football managers
Association football forwards